José Ochoa (born 2 February 1972) is a Venezuelan wrestler. He competed in the men's Greco-Roman 48 kg at the 1996 Summer Olympics.

References

1972 births
Living people
Venezuelan male sport wrestlers
Olympic wrestlers of Venezuela
Wrestlers at the 1996 Summer Olympics
Place of birth missing (living people)